Salman Afridi (born 3 August 1992) is a Pakistani cricketer. He made his List A debut for Sui Northern Gas Pipelines Limited in the 2016–17 Departmental One Day Cup on 17 December 2016. He made his first-class debut for Habib Bank Limited in the 2017–18 Quaid-e-Azam Trophy on 26 September 2017.

References

External links
 

1992 births
Living people
Pakistani cricketers
Habib Bank Limited cricketers
Sui Northern Gas Pipelines Limited cricketers
People from Khyber District